Edward Townsend Mix (May 13, 1831 – September 2, 1890) was an American architect of the Gilded Age who designed many buildings in the Midwestern United States. His career was centered in Milwaukee, Wisconsin, and many of his designs made use of the region's distinctive Cream City brick.

Biography

Mix was born in New Haven, Connecticut, on May 13, 1831, the first child of Edward A. and Emily M. Mix. The family moved west to Andover, Illinois, in 1836. They relocated again to New York City in 1845, where E. Townsend Mix began studying architecture. He would eventually be apprenticed to Connecticut architect Sidney Mason Stone. Mix also studied under Richard Upjohn, who brought Mix towards the Gothic Revival architecture that would become one of his most enduring styles.

In 1855, E. Townsend Mix moved to Chicago, Illinois, and began a brief partnership with architect William W. Boyington. The firm's work took Mix to Milwaukee, Wisconsin, where he decided to begin an independent practice in 1856. Mix dissolved his partnership with Boyington and began designing homes and businesses for Milwaukee's leading residents.

Mix was appointed Wisconsin's State Architect from 1864 to 1867.  The end of the Civil War brought an important contract when he was chosen to design the Milwaukee branch of the National Soldiers' Home for disabled war veterans. The resulting structure, finished in 1869, is a colorful Gothic Revival building that still towers over the surrounding park and cemetery. Mix also designed the Gothic Revival Cathedral Church of All Saints and the Monroe Methodist Church at about this time.

Mix's career further accelerated when the new state of Kansas selected his French Renaissance design for the Kansas State Capitol in Topeka. Construction began in 1866, and several other architects including John G. Haskell modified Mix's design before the building was completed 37 years later.

During the early 1870s, Mix designed a number of Italianate homes for prominent Midwestern families, including Villa Louis in Prairie du Chien for H. Louis Dousman in 1870, and in 1874 both the Robert Patrick Fitzgerald House in Milwaukee and Montauk in Clermont, Iowa, home of Iowa governor William Larrabee.

By the second half of the 1870s, Mix shifted much of his focus to the Second Empire style. In 1873 he remodeled the home of leading Milwaukee businessman Alexander Mitchell in this style, giving it a four-story tower and mansard roofs. Later Mitchell would hire Mix to use the same style in designing two commercial buildings in downtown Milwaukee: the Mitchell Building in 1876 and the Mackie Building in 1879.

In the 1880s, Mix adopted a number of additional styles for his buildings. He used Romanesque Revival for St. Paul's Episcopal Church, built in Milwaukee in 1874, and he employed elements of Queen Anne and Eastlake styles for the A. H. Allyn House in Delavan, Wisconsin, in 1885. Mix sometimes mixed these styles with Gothic Revival, as in the Everett Street Depot built in 1886 for the Milwaukee Road. By this time, however, the styles favored by Mix were falling out of fashion in Milwaukee as its increasingly German population demanded buildings more reminiscent of their homeland.

Later in his career Mix also designed a number of projects in Minneapolis and Saint Paul, Minnesota (he would eventually move to Minneapolis in 1888). In 1883 he designed a grand mansion for William D. Washburn called Fair Oaks. He designed a pair of buildings for the Saint Paul Globe newspaper, one in Saint Paul (1887) and another in Minneapolis (1889). In 1888 he embarked on his largest project, the Northwestern Guaranty Loan Building, a twelve-story skyscraper in Richardsonian Romanesque style built with red Lake Superior sandstone. It was finished in 1890, the year of E. Townsend Mix's death in Minneapolis.

Legacy

E. Townsend Mix was a versatile architect who practiced an eclectic variety of styles, and although he sometimes mixed styles in novel ways, he did little to push the boundaries of any particular style. However, in his effort to remain abreast of changing architectural fashions, Mix introduced to the Upper Midwest many popular styles from eastern cities, and his buildings helped shape the landscape of urban Milwaukee and Minneapolis. Although urban renewal projects led to the demolition of some notable Mix buildings, including the Northwestern Guaranty Loan Building and the Everett Street Depot, many of his designs still stand, and several are listed on the National Register of Historic Places (NRHP).

Works

References
 Burrows, John R. (1980). The Work of E. Townsend Mix from 1856–1890. Thesis (M. Architectural History)--University of Virginia, 1980.

External links
 
Roof garden of the Northwestern Guaranty Loan Building in a painting by William Allen Rogers
The men behind the Northwestern Guaranty Loan Building

Architects from Milwaukee
Architects from New Haven, Connecticut
1831 births
1890 deaths
19th-century American architects